is a retired Japanese football player. He last played for ReinMeer Aomori in Japan Football League.

Career
He has previous played in Singapore's S.League for Albirex Niigata FC (Singapore) and Geylang International. He started his career with Thespa Kusatsu.

Club statistics 
Updated to 20 February 2019.

References

External links

Profile at ReinMeer Aomori
j-league

1986 births
Living people
Waseda University alumni
Association football people from Niigata Prefecture
Japanese footballers
J2 League players
Japan Football League players
Singapore Premier League players
Thespakusatsu Gunma players
Albirex Niigata Singapore FC players
Geylang International FC players
ReinMeer Aomori players
Expatriate footballers in Singapore
Association football goalkeepers